The 2004 Women's Pan-American Volleyball Cup was the third edition of the annual women's volleyball tournament, played by ten countries from June 17 to June 27, 2004 in Mexicali and Tijuana, Mexico. The intercontinental event served as a qualifier for the 2005 FIVB World Grand Prix.

Competing nations

Squads

Preliminary round

Group A

Friday June 18, 2004

Saturday June 19, 2004

Sunday June 20, 2004

Monday June 21, 2004

Tuesday June 22, 2004

Group B

Friday June 18, 2004

Saturday June 19, 2004

Sunday June 20, 2004

Monday June 21, 2004

Tuesday June 22, 2004

Final round

Thursday June 24, 2004
Ninth Place Match

Seventh Place Match

Friday June 25, 2004
Fifth Place Match

Semi-finals

Sunday June 27, 2004
Bronze Medal Match

Gold Medal Match

Final ranking

Cuba, United States, Dominican Republic and Brazil qualified for the 2005 World Grand Prix

Individual awards

Most Valuable Player:

Best Attacker:

Best Blocker:

Best Digger:

Best Libero:

Best Receiver:

Best Server:

Best Setter:

References

 Results
 USA Volleyball
 results

Women's Pan-American Volleyball Cup
Pan-American Volleyball Cup
P
Volleyball
Women's Pan-American Volleyball Cup
2004 in Mexican women's sports